Blankenheim may refer to:

Places
Blankenheim, North Rhine-Westphalia, a municipality in western Germany
Blankenheim, Saxony-Anhalt, a municipality in eastern Germany
Blankenheim Castle, a schloss above the village of Blankenheim in the Eifel mountains of Germany

People
Clara Elisabeth of Manderscheid-Blankenheim (1631–1688), canoness at Thorn Abbey and Essen Abbey, and deaness at Elten Abbey
Leon Young de Blankenheim (1837?–1863), French Army soldier
Frederick of Blankenheim (c. 1355–1423), bishop of Strasbourg as Friedrich II and bishop of Utrecht as Frederik III

Surname
Ed Blankenheim (1934–2004), American civil rights activist and one of the original Freedom Riders
Karoline von Manderscheid-Blankenheim (1768–1831), princess consort of Liechtenstein
Toni Blankenheim (1921–2012), German operatic baritone
Walter Blankenheim (1926–2007), German pianist and teacher